Polyommatus baytopi is a butterfly in the family Lycaenidae. It was described by de Hubert de Lesse in 1959. Type locality is given as "Dogubayazit (Turquie Orient.)" [E. Turkey, Agri Prov.], at 2300m altitude. The species range is Eastern Turkey.

References

Butterflies described in 1959
Polyommatus
Butterflies of Asia